Vishwakarma Jayanti is a day of celebration for Vishwakarma, a Hindu god, the divine architect. 

The festival is observed primarily in factories and industrial areas, often on the shop floor. As a mark of reverence the day of worship is marked not only by the engineering and architectural community but by artisans, craftsmen, mechanics, smiths, welders, industrial workers, factory workers and others. They pray for a better future, safe working conditions and, above all, success in their respective fields. Workers also pray for the smooth functioning of various machines. In many part of India there is government holiday on 17 September for the celebration but it is not considered as a national holiday but as a "restricted holiday".

It falls on 'Kanya Sankranti' of Hindu calendar. It is generally celebrated every year between 16 to 18 September, according to the Gregorian calendar, which is on the last day of the Indian Bhado month. The festival is also celebrated in Nepal. Haldia an industrial area in West Bengal is famous for Vishwakarma puja. Vishwakarma puja is also celebrated a day after Diwali, along with Govardhan Puja in October–November.

Vishwakarma 
Vishwakarma is considered as swayambhu and creator of the world. He constructed the holy city of Dwarka where Krishna ruled, the palace of Indraprastha for the Pandavas, and was the creator of many fabulous weapons for the gods. He is also called the divine carpenter, is mentioned in the Rig Veda, and is credited with Sthapatya Veda, the science of mechanics and architecture.

According to sacred Hindu tradition, Vishwakarma is known as the Divine Engineer of the world. Like every other God, Vishwakarma is assigned a day that is his birthday or Jayanti that is Vishwakarma Jayanti. Vishwakarma is the presiding deity of all craftsmen and architects. Son of Brahma, he is the divine craftsman of the whole universe, and the official builder of all the gods' palaces.

References

Further reading 

 
 

Hindu holy days
Hindu festivals
September observances
October observances
November observances

Religious festivals in India